Nieuw-Wehl is a village in the eastern Netherlands, about 10 km west of Doetinchem. Before 1 January 2005, it was part of the municipality of Wehl, along with neighboring village Wehl. After the division, Nieuw-Wehl joined the municipality of Doetinchem.

Nieuw-Wehl was first mentioned between 1830 and 1855 as "Achter Wehl", meaning behind Wehl. It started to develop in the early 20th century. In 1925, a Roman Catholic church was built. In 1933, the name officially changed to Nieuw-Wehl. The grist mill Bernadette was built in 1861 and restored in 1965 and 1998.

Gallery

References 

Populated places in Gelderland
Doetinchem